Nanette Fabray (born Ruby Bernadette Nanette Theresa Fabares; October 27, 1920 – February 22, 2018) was an American actress, singer, and dancer. She began her career performing in vaudeville as a child and became a musical-theatre actress during the 1940s and 1950s, acclaimed for her role in High Button Shoes (1947) and winning a Tony Award in 1949 for her performance in Love Life. In the mid-1950s, she served as Sid Caesar's comedic partner on Caesar's Hour, for which she won three Emmy Awards, as well as appearing with Fred Astaire in the film musical The Band Wagon. From 1979 to 1984, she played Katherine Romano, the mother of lead character Ann Romano, on the TV series One Day at a Time. She also appeared as the mother of Christine Armstrong (played by her niece Shelley Fabares) in the television series "Coach."

Fabray overcame a significant hearing impairment and was a long-time advocate for the rights of the deaf and hard-of-hearing. Her honors for representing disabled people included the President's Distinguished Service Award and the Eleanor Roosevelt Humanitarian Award.

Early life
Fabray was born Ruby Bernadette Nanette Theresa Fabares on October 27, 1920, in San Diego, to Lily Agnes (McGovern), a housewife, and Raoul Bernard Fabares, a train conductor. 

She used one of her middle names, Nanette, as her first name in honor of a beloved aunt from San Diego, whose name was also Nanette. Throughout life, she often went by the nickname Nan, and to a lesser extent, by close friends or relatives, sometimes Nanny-goat. Her family resided in Los Angeles, and Fabray's mother was instrumental in getting her daughter involved in show business as a child. At a young age, she studied tap dance with, among others, Bill "Bojangles" Robinson. She made her professional stage debut as "Miss New Years Eve 1923" at the Million Dollar Theater at the age of three. She spent much of her childhood appearing in vaudeville productions as a dancer and singer under the name "Baby Nan." She appeared with stars such as Ben Turpin. 

Raised by what would now likely be known as a "stage mother", Fabray herself was not much interested in show business until later on, and never believed in pushing children into performing at a young age, instead wishing for them to be able to live out their childhoods as opposed to having to deal with adult concerns at a young age. Her early dance training, however, did lead her always to consider herself a tap dancer first and foremost. Contrary to popular misinformation from an undying rumor, she was never a regular or recurring guest of the Our Gang series; she did, however, appear as an extra one single time, a guest among many other children in a party scene.

Fabray's parents divorced when she was nine, but they continued living together for financial reasons. During the Great Depression, her mother turned their home into a boarding house, which Fabray and her siblings helped run, Nanette's main job being ironing clothes. In her early teenage years, Fabray attended the Max Reinhardt School of the Theatre on a scholarship. She then attended Hollywood High School, participating in the drama program with a favorite teacher, where she graduated in 1939. She beat out classmate Alexis Smith for the lead in the school play her senior year. Fabray entered Los Angeles Junior College in the fall of 1939, but did not do well and withdrew a few months later. 

She had always had difficulty in school due to an undiagnosed hearing impairment, which made learning difficult. She eventually was diagnosed with a conductive hearing loss (due to congenital, progressive otosclerosis) in her twenties after an acting teacher encouraged her to get her hearing tested. Fabray said of the experience, "It was a revelation to me. All these years I had thought I was stupid, but in reality, I just had a hearing problem." Fabray gave many interviews over the years and much of the information known about her was revealed in these conversations.

In 2004, she was interviewed for posterity in the oral history Archives of American Television as an Emmy TV legend.

Career

Theatre
At the age of 19, Fabray made her feature film debut as one of Bette Davis's ladies-in-waiting in The Private Lives of Elizabeth and Essex (1939). She appeared in two additional movies that year for Warner Bros., The Monroe Doctrine (short) and A Child Is Born, but was not signed to a long-term studio contract. She next appeared in the stage production Meet the People in Los Angeles in 1940, which then toured the United States in 1940–1941. In the show, she sang the opera aria "Caro nome" from Giuseppe Verdi's Rigoletto while tap dancing. During the show's New York run, Fabray was invited to perform the "Caro nome" number for a benefit at Madison Square Garden with Eleanor Roosevelt as the main speaker. Ed Sullivan was the master of ceremonies for the event and the famed host, reading a cue card, mispronounced her name as "Nanette Fa-bare-ass." After this embarrassing faux pas, the actress immediately legally changed the spelling of her name from Fabares to as close as possible a match to the proper pronunciation: Fabray. 
 
Artur Rodziński, conductor of the New York Philharmonic, saw Fabray's performance in Meet the People and offered to sponsor operatic vocal training for her at the Juilliard School. She studied opera at Juilliard with Lucia Dunham during the latter half of 1941 while performing in her first Broadway musical, Cole Porter's Let's Face It!, with Danny Kaye and Eve Arden. She decided that studying during the day and performing at night was too much for her and took away from her active social nightlife which she so enjoyed, and that she preferred performing in musical theatre over opera; thus she withdrew from the school after about five months. She became a successful musical-theatre actress in New York during the 1940s and early 1950s, starring in such productions as By Jupiter (1942), My Dear Public (1943), Jackpot (1944), Bloomer Girl (1946), High Button Shoes (1947), Arms and the Girl (1950), and Make a Wish (1951). In 1949, she won the Tony Award for Best Actress in a Musical for her portrayal of Susan Cooper in the Kurt Weill/Alan Jay Lerner musical Love Life. She received a Tony nomination for her role as Nell Henderson in  Mr. President in 1963, after an 11-year absence from the New York stage. Fabray continued to tour in musicals for many years, appearing in such shows as Wonderful Town and No, No, Nanette.

Television and film

In the mid-1940s, Fabray worked regularly for NBC on a variety of programs in the Los Angeles area. In the late 1940s and early 1950s, she made her first high-profile national television appearances performing on a number of variety programs such as The Ed Sullivan Show, Texaco Star Theatre, and The Arthur Murray Party.

She also appeared on Your Show of Shows as a guest star opposite Sid Caesar. She appeared as a regular on Caesar's Hour from 1954 to 1956, winning three Emmys. Fabray left the show after a misunderstanding when her business manager, unbeknownst to her, made unreasonable demands for her third-season contract. Fabray and Caesar did not reconcile until years later.

In 1961, Fabray starred in 26 episodes of Westinghouse Playhouse, a half-hour sitcom series that also was known as The Nanette Fabray Show or Yes, Yes Nanette. The character was mainly loosely based on herself and her own life as a newly married couple with her husband and her new stepchildren.

Fabray appeared as the mother of the main character on several television series such as One Day at a Time, The Mary Tyler Moore Show, and Coach, where she played mother to real-life niece Shelley Fabares. Like her aunt, Shelley Fabares also appeared on One Day at a Time.

Fabray made 13 guest appearances on The Carol Burnett Show. She performed on multiple episodes of The Dean Martin Show, The Hollywood Palace, Perry Como's Kraft Music Hall, and The Andy Williams Show. She was a panelist on 230 episodes of the long-running game show The Hollywood Squares, as well as a mystery guest on What's My Line? and later a panelist on Match Game in 1973. Other recurring game show appearances by Fabray included participation in Password, I've Got a Secret, He Said, She Said, and Celebrity Bowling. She also appeared on the game shows Stump the Stars, Let's Make a Deal, All Star Secrets, and a television series families "All Star special" of Family Feud with fellow One Day at a Time cast members.

She appeared in guest-starring roles on Burke's Law, Love, American Style, Maude, The Love Boat, and Murder, She Wrote. On the PBS program Pioneers of Television: Sitcoms, Mary Tyler Moore credited Fabray with inspiring her trademark comedic crying technique. In 1986, Fabray was cast in the TBS sitcom project Here to Stay, which also starred Robert Mandan and Heather O'Rourke. Although a pilot episode was shot, it was not picked up as a series.

In 1953, Fabray played her best-known screen role as a Betty Comden-like playwright in the Metro-Goldwyn-Mayer musical The Band Wagon with Fred Astaire and Jack Buchanan. The film in one scene featured Fabray, Astaire, and Buchanan performing the classic comedic musical number "Triplets", which was also included in That's Entertainment, Part II. Fabray's additional film credits include The Happy Ending (1969), Harper Valley PTA (1978), and Amy (1981).

Fabray's final work was in 2007, when she appeared in The Damsel Dialogues, an original revue by composer Dick DeBenedictis, with direction/choreography by Miriam Nelson. The show, which was performed at the Whitefire Theatre in Sherman Oaks, California, focused on women's issues with life, love, loss, and the workplace.

Personal life
Fabray's first husband, David Tebet, was in television marketing and talent, and later became a vice president of NBC. According to Fabray, their marriage ended in divorce partially because of her depression, anxiety, and insecurities surrounding her worsening hearing loss. Her second husband was screenwriter Ranald MacDougall, whose writing credits include Mildred Pierce and Cleopatra and who, in the early 1970s, served as president of the Writers Guild of America. The couple was married from 1957 until his death in 1973. They had one son together: Jamie MacDougall. 
She was a resident of Pacific Palisades, California, and was the aunt of singer/actress Shelley Fabares. Her niece's 1984 wedding to M*A*S*H actor Mike Farrell was held at her home. Longtime neighbors, Fabray was associated with Ronald Reagan's campaign for the governorship of California in 1966.

She was hospitalized for almost two weeks after being knocked unconscious by a falling pipe backstage during a live broadcast of Caesar's Hour in 1955. The audience in the studio heard her screams and Sid Caesar had at first been told she had been killed in the freak accident. Fabray suffered a serious concussion along with associated temporary vision impairment and photosensitivity/photophobia. Later, she realized she had only avoided being directly impaled because of the position she happened to have been in at the time (bending over as opposed to standing up straight). In 1978, during the filming of Harper Valley PTA, Fabray suffered a second major concussion when she was knocked over, hitting her neck on the sidewalk and the back of her head on a rock. The accident was caused when a live elephant appearing in the film stampeded when spooked by a drunken civilian bystander, who had bypassed the blocked-off street on the set. Fabray developed associated memory loss and visual issues such as nystagmus, but still had to finish her scenes (namely a car chase) in the movie, for which filming had not yet finished. She had to be closely directed and coached, fed line-by-line, as she could not remember any of her lines or cues due to the concussion. She also had to be filmed only from specific angles to mask the obvious abnormal eye movements the concussion had temporarily caused.

Activism
A longtime champion of hearing awareness and support of the deaf, she sat on boards and spoke at many related functions. A forward-thinking proponent of total communication and teaching the deaf language and communication in any way possible, including American Sign Language and not just the oralism method of the time, Fabray was one of, if not the first, to use sign language on [live] television, something which she continued to showcase on many programs on which she made appearances, including the Carol Burnett Show, Match Game '73, and I've Got a Secret. She even contributed the story line to an entire 1982 episode of One Day at a Time, which focused on hearing loss awareness and acceptance, treatment options, and sign language. Fabray appeared in a 1986 infomercial for hearing device and deafness support products for House Ear Institute. In 2001, she wrote to advice columnist Dear Abby to decry the loud background music played on television programs. A founding member of the National Captioning Institute, she also was one of the first big names to bring awareness to the need for media closed-captioning.

Likewise, after the passing of her second husband, Randy MacDougall, Fabray also started to learn about the tribulations associated with spousal death and began to bring awareness to the need for changes in the law for widows and widowers. She focused her later years on campaigning for widows' rights, particularly pertaining to women's inheritance laws, taxes, and asset protection.

Death
Fabray died on February 22, 2018, at the Canterbury Nursing home in California at the age of 97 from natural causes.

Honors
A Tony and three-time Primetime Emmy award winner, Fabray has a star on the Hollywood Walk of Fame. In 1986, she received a Life Achievement award from the Screen Actors Guild.

She won a Golden Apple award from the Hollywood Women's Press Club in 1960 along with Janet Leigh for being a Most Cooperative actress.

She was awarded the President's Distinguished Service Award and the Eleanor Roosevelt Humanitarian Award for her long efforts on behalf of the deaf and hard-of-hearing.

Partial filmography

Film

Television

Stage work
The Miracle (1939)
Six Characters in Search of an Author (1939)
The Servant of Two Masters (1939)
Meet the People (1940)
Let's Face It! (1941) 
By Jupiter (1942) (replacement for Constance Moore)
My Dear Public (1943) 
Jackpot (1944) 
Bloomer Girl (1945; 1947; 1949)
High Button Shoes (1947) 
Love Life (1948) 
Arms and the Girl (1950) 
Make a Wish (1951) 
Mr. President (1962) 
No Hard Feelings (1973) 
Applause (1973)
Plaza Suite (1975)
Wonderful Town (1975)
The Secret Affairs of Mildred Wild (1977)
Call Me Madam (1979) 
Cactus Flower (1984) 
Prince of Central Park (1989) (replacement for Jo Anne Worley)
The Bermuda Avenue Triangle (1997)

References

Citations

Sources

External links 

 
 
  
 

1920 births
2018 deaths
20th-century American actresses
21st-century American actresses
American film actresses
American television actresses
American musical theatre actresses
Tony Award winners
Donaldson Award winners
Outstanding Performance by a Lead Actress in a Comedy Series Primetime Emmy Award winners
Outstanding Performance by a Supporting Actress in a Comedy Series Primetime Emmy Award winners
Screen Actors Guild Life Achievement Award
American women comedians
Actresses from San Diego
Vaudeville performers
Comedians from California
California Republicans
20th-century American comedians
21st-century American comedians